Fumonelix jonesiana (syn. Mesodon jonesianus) is a species of land snail in the family Polygyridae. Its common names are Jones' middle-toothed land snail and big-tooth covert. It is native to North Carolina and Tennessee in the United States, where it occurs in Great Smoky Mountains National Park.

References

Polygyridae
Endemic fauna of the United States
Gastropods described in 1938
Natural history of North Carolina
Natural history of Tennessee
Taxonomy articles created by Polbot
Taxobox binomials not recognized by IUCN